A finger is an appendage found on the hands of humans and primates.

Finger or fingers may also refer to:

 The finger, a vulgar hand gesture
 Finger (unit), several units of measurement based on the width of a finger

Places

Canada
 The Finger (Alberta), a mountain in the Canadian Rockies
 Finger, Manitoba, a community
 Finger Lake, Finger-Tatuk Provincial Park, British Columbia

United States
 Finger, North Carolina
 Finger, Tennessee
 Finger Lakes, a group of lakes in New York
 Finger Lake (Alaska)
 Finger Mountain, Alaska

Other places
Finger Mountain (Antarctica)

Arts and entertainment
 Fingers (1941 film), a British drama
 Fingers (1978 film), an American drama
 The Finger (band), a hardcore punk band
 Fingers (album), by Airto Moreira, 1973
 The Finger (album), by Babyland, 2004
 "Fingers", a song by Pink from the 2006 album I'm Not Dead
 "The Finger" (CSI), an 2002 TV episode 
 "Finger" (Bottom), a 1995 episode of the British TV sitcom

People
 Finger (surname), including a list of people with the name
 Rollie Fingers (born 1946), American baseball player
 Johnnie Fingers (John Peter Moylett, born 1956), Irish pianist, founding member The Boomtown Rats
 Michael Fingleton (born 1938), Irish businessman, known as Fingers in the banking community
 Greg "Fingers" Taylor, American harmonica player
 Larry Heard (born 1960), American DJ, record producer and musician known as Mr. Fingers

Other uses
 Cadbury Fingers, a biscuit
 Finger (protocol), in computer networking
 Fingers (game), a drinking game
 IAI Finger, an upgraded version of the IAI Nesher aircraft 
 Finger, or Jet bridge, an airport passenger boarding bridge

See also

 Fingering (disambiguation)
 Finger Lake (disambiguation)
 Finger Point (disambiguation)